Ellis Gee (15 June 1877 – 1948) was an English footballer who played in the Football League for Everton and Notts County.

References

1877 births
1948 deaths
English footballers
Association football forwards
English Football League players
Sheepbridge Works F.C. players
Chesterfield F.C. players
Everton F.C. players
Notts County F.C. players
Reading F.C. players
Ilkeston United F.C. players